The Purcell–Killingsworth House, now the Garden Path Inn bed & breakfast, is a historic residence in Columbia, Alabama. Also known as Traveler's Rest, it was completed in 1890 by William Henry Purcell (1845-1910), a prominent Columbia businessman and politician. Purcell's business interests included a steamboat landing on the Chattahoochee River. The bed and breakfast has three guestrooms.

The Purcell House was also the boyhood home of Bishop Clare Purcell (1884-1964). In 1955 he was elected President of the Council of Bishops, the highest place of recognition ever achieved by a native-born Alabama Methodist minister.

In 1946, the Purcell Family sold the two acre homestead to Mr. & Mrs. Henry Killingsworth who restored the Victorian mansion. It was added to the National Register of Historic Places on December 16, 1982. It is located on Main Street.

References

National Register of Historic Places in Houston County, Alabama
Houses on the National Register of Historic Places in Alabama
Queen Anne architecture in Alabama
Houses completed in 1889
Houses in Houston County, Alabama
Bed and breakfasts in Alabama